DIANA Mayer & Grammelspacher is an air gun manufacturer founded and based in Rastatt, Germany. The company, named after Diana, the mythological goddess of the hunt, is best known for producing quality air rifles.

History

Establishment
Mayer & Grammelspacher GmbH was founded in Rastatt in 1890 by 24-year old toolmaker Jakob Mayer and financier Josef Grammelspacher, initially focusing on household metal goods. Two years later they introduced their first air gun, a pistol, based on the Haviland & Gunn model of 1872. The first rifle, a break barrel design, followed in 1895. Early products were marked "MGR" (for Mayer, Grammelspacher and Rastatt) before the introduction of the now-famous "Diana" brand name. In 1901 Grammelspacher left the company for reasons unknown, whilst Mayer was awarded his first patent.

Initial success
A steady stream of improved designs characterized the first decade of the 20th century, culminating in the classic Model 27. This successful model was produced in various forms from 1910 up to 1987. The popularity of shooting as a leisure activity prompted development of a range of children's toy guns (firing arrows tipped with suction cups) under the Eureka brand.

WW2 and aftermath
The Second World War stymied Diana's early success, with sanctions imposed on the Nazi government severely limiting export opportunities. By 1940 civilian production was halted and the factory was commandeered to produce parts for Mauser, which led to heavy Allied bombing. After the fall of Germany in 1945, the production of arms was outlawed. The occupying forces decommissioned the factory and sold the company lock, stock and barrel to England's Millard Brothers (Milbro), who moved production to Scotland. The sale included all assets, even the trademark "Diana".

Not Diana
The company formerly known as Diana was allowed to restart production of air guns in 1950, during the reconstruction of Germany. Due to the loss of their trademark, their products were sold under various other names including "Original" in Germany, "Diana Original" in England,  Beeman, Hy-Score and Winchester in the USA and "GECADO" in the Common Wealth countries. In 1963 they introduced an innovative recoilless air rifle, the Model 60.

Restoration
In 1984, after almost 40 years, the company finally regained their trademark when Milbro went bust. At the 1988 Summer Olympics a silver medal was won by Silvia Sperber in the Women's 10 metre air rifle event using a Diana rifle. In 1990 the company celebrated their Centenary.

Acquisition
In 2014 the company was bought by German Sport Guns GmbH.

Products

Notable
 Diana Model 27 - Classic break barrel spring-piston rifle, sold in various forms from 1910 to 1987
 Diana Model 60 - Early recoilless break barrel spring-piston rifle, sold from 1960 to 1982

Earlier
Rifles
 Break barrel
 Diana 24
 
 Fixed barrel
 Diana 50
 Diana 46
 Diana 430
Diana 35
Pistols
 Break barrel
 Diana 5

Current
Rifles
 Break barrel
 Diana 31
 Diana 34

 Diana 240
 Diana 250
 Diana 280
 Diana 350
 Fixed barrel
 Side lever
 Diana 48
 Diana 56 Th target 
 Diana 54
 Underlever
 Diana K98
 Diana 460 Magnum
 Diana 470TH Target Hunter
 Overlever
 Diana Oktoberfest
 Pre-charged pneumatic
 Diana P1000 EVO2
 Diana Outlaw
 Diana Skyhawk (bullpup)
 Diana Stormrider

Pistols
 Diana LP8 Magnum
 Diana Bandit

Accessories
 Scopes
 Pellets
 Silhouette targets
 Silencer

Gallery

See also 
 Feinwerkbau
 Umarex
 Walther
 Weihrauch

References

External links
Official Website
Official Facebook page
Blue Book of Gun Values - Dianawerk

Air guns
Manufacturing companies of Germany
Manufacturing companies established in 1890